The Prize Baby is a 1915 American silent comedy film featuring Oliver Hardy.

Plot

Cast
 Oliver Hardy as Bill, the Prize Baby (as Babe Hardy)
 Raymond McKee as Pip
 Billy Bowers as Boots
 Frances Ne Moyer as Florence

See also
 Oliver Hardy filmography

External links

kid Maintenance

1915 films
American silent short films
American black-and-white films
1915 comedy films
1915 short films
Films directed by Jerold T. Hevener
Silent American comedy films
American comedy short films
1910s American films